Hontenisse (population in 2002: 8,014) is a former municipality in the southwestern Netherlands, in the municipality of Hulst in the province of Zeeland. The municipality covered an area of 115.78 km² (of which 3.53 km² water).

On January 1, 2003 Hontenisse was merged into Hulst.

References

External links 

Official website

Municipalities of the Netherlands disestablished in 2003
Former municipalities of Zeeland
Hulst